Sögel is a municipality in the Emsland district, in Lower Saxony, Germany. Sögel is most known for the Clemenswerth Palace, a hunting lodge built 1737-1749 by Johann Conrad Schlaun for Elector Clemens August.

Personalities

Born in Sögel 

 Wilhelm Röpke (1873-1945), surgeon in Wuppertal, president of the German Society of Surgery
 Bernhard Rakers (1905-1980), Nazi war criminal

Died in Sögel 
 Katharina Sibylla Schücking (1791-1831), poet
 Johann Heermann (1897-1976), politician, MdL

World War II
Much of the centre of Sögel was deliberately destroyed by the Canadian Army after the town was captured in April 1945.

References

Emsland